Alexandru Cristian Ciocâlteu (born 16 April 1990) is a Romanian professional footballer who plays as a midfielder for CSC 1599 Șelimbăr.

Honours
Petrolul Ploiești
Liga III: 2017–18

References

External links
 
 

1990 births
Living people
People from Sinaia
Romanian footballers
AFC Dacia Unirea Brăila players
FC Brașov (1936) players
Racing Club Beirut players
ASIL Lysi players
FC Petrolul Ploiești players
CS Aerostar Bacău players
FC Metaloglobus București players
CSC 1599 Șelimbăr players
Liga I players
Liga II players
Cypriot Second Division players
Lebanese Premier League players
Romanian expatriate footballers
Expatriate footballers in Lebanon
Expatriate footballers in Cyprus
Romanian expatriate sportspeople in Lebanon
Romanian expatriate sportspeople in Cyprus
Association football midfielders